Renascent is an unblack metal band that originated in Helsinki, Finland, and the core of the band now currently reside in Bloomington, Indiana. The band has released an EP titled, Demon's Quest in 2004 and a full length titled Through Darkness in 2005. The band released their sophomore album, Praise of the Lord God Almighty, on 5 November 2016. The band is openly Christian. The band has been compared to Dimmu Borgir and Old Man's Child.

History
Renascent started in the beginning of the year 2003. The band started with drummer Jani Stefanovic meeting guitarist Eero Tertsunen and keyboardist Mikaela Akrenius. The band official came up with their name the same week bassist Voitto Rintala joined the band. In Summer 2004, the band hired Barry Hilliden to become their vocalist and the band recorded their debut release Demon's Quest. In 2005, the band released Through Darkness and soon after the release, Stefanovic and Hilliden both departed from the band. Stefanovic then formed the band Miseration with former Scar Symmetry vocalist Christian Älvestam. The band remained inactive until around 2014, when the band started recording a new album. The album was scheduled to be released in 2016 with Tertsunen on vocals and guitar, Rintala on bass, Akrenius on keyboards and new member Markus Saarela on drums. The album, Praise of the Lord God Almighty was later released on 5 November 2016.

Discography

Studio albums
 Through Darkness (2005)
 Praise to the Lord God Almighty (2016)

EPs
 Demon's Quest (2004)

Members
Current
 Eero Tertsunen - Guitar (2003–present), Vocals (2003-2004, 2005–present) (Angel of Sodom, The Slave Eye, Symphony of Heaven, The UnWorthy)
 Voitto Rintala - Bass (2003–present)
 Mikaela Akrenius - Keyboards (2003–present)
 Joonas Heikkinen - Drums (2014–present) (Angel of Sodom, The Slave Eye, ex-Temple of Perdition)

Former
 Jani Stefanović - Drums, Vocals (Divinefire, ex-Crimson Moonlight) (2003-2005)
 Barry Halldan - Vocals (ex-Darkend) (2004-2005)
 Markus Saarela - Drums (2005-2007)

Touring
 Carlos Osnaya - Guitar (2018–present) (ex-Temple of Perdition, The UnWorthy, Exousia)
 Pekka Taina - Guitar (2005) (Sáwol, ex-Sotahuuto)

Session
 Rolf Pilve - Drums (2016) (Stratovarius)

Timeline

References

Musical groups established in 2003
Finnish Christian metal musical groups
Finnish death metal musical groups
Unblack metal musical groups